Tracey Leigh Spicer  is an Australian newsreader, Walkley Award-winning journalist and social justice advocate. She is known for her association with Network Ten as a newsreader in the 1990s and 2000s when she co-hosted Ten Eyewitness News in Brisbane, Queensland. She later went on to work with Sky News Australia as a reporter and presenter from 2007 to 2015. In May 2017 Spicer released her autobiography, The Good Girl Stripped Bare. She was appointed as a Member of the Order of Australia "For significant service to the broadcast media as a journalist and television presenter, and as an ambassador for social welfare and charitable groups".

Early life and education
Spicer was born in Brisbane.

In 1987, Spicer graduated from the Queensland Institute of Technology with a Bachelor of Business (Communications) with a major in journalism.

Career

Spicer began her career at Macquarie National News providing reports to the Brisbane station 4BH, before moving to Melbourne radio station 3AW as morning news editor. Spicer moved on to television: first for the rural network, Southern Cross Television, and the Nine Network. The Network Ten station in Melbourne later hired Spicer as a local correspondent and then co-host of the First at Five News in Brisbane (with Glenn Taylor and Geoff Mullins). In 1995 she moved to Sydney to present the National Weekend News bulletins, and late night news until it was taken off air in 2005. Spicer remained with Network Ten until the end of 2006.

In late 2006, after 14 years with the network, Spicer was dismissed after returning from maternity leave when her second child was two months old. In a 10-page letter of demand served to Network Ten, Spicer claimed she had been discriminated against since giving birth to her first child in 2004. The case garnered attention in the media, with speculation she was fired because of her age; Network Ten strongly denied allegations of discrimination and said it was related to ongoing restructuring of the news division and related cost efficiencies. Spicer threatened to take the case to the Federal Court, but eventually settled with the network. She signed off for the final time on New Year's Eve 2006, beginning work with Sky News Australia four days later. Spicer worked as a Sky News presenter until leaving in 2015.

Spicer has hosted the Ethnic Business Awards, which is a national business award that highlights and celebrates migrant and Indigenous excellence in business, for 11 years in a row (2008-2018).

Spicer writes the Mama Holiday column for Traveller Magazine’s Sunday edition, focusing on family holidays. Spicer was previously a weekly op ed columnist with Wendy Harmer’s The Hoopla from 2011 to 2015 and travel writer and ambassador for Holiday with Kids Magazine from 2009 to 2014. She was a columnist with the Daily Telegraph newspaper.

Since August 2015, Spicer has been an occasional contributor to ABC TV’s The Drum and currently works as a freelance writer, speaker, media trainer and broadcaster through her two media companies, Spicer Communications and Outspoken Women.

Spicer produced a documentary for the World Wildlife Fund, World Vision and other non-government organisations about the plight of women in Bangladesh, Kenya, Uganda, Papua New Guinea, and India.

In late June 2022 Spicer said in an interview that since contracting COVID-19 in January, subsequently developing Long COVID, she had had to reduce her working hours since returning to work. By June she was down to working only 4 hours per fortnight.

Advocacy and views

Spicer is an ambassador for World Vision, the World Wide Fund for Nature (WWF), the Queensland University of Technology's Learning Potential Fund and the Penguin Foundation, and Patron of the NSW Cancer Council, the newborn care unit at the Royal Hospital for Women, the Life's Little Treasures Foundation and the National Premmie Foundation.

She is also an Ambassador for Dying with Dignity, and is the face of the Garvan Institute of Medical Research’s research into pancreatic cancer, the disease responsible for her mother's death.

In January 2011, Spicer interviewed anti-vaccination campaigner, Meryl Dorey (Australian Vaccination Network now Australian Vaccination-Skeptics Network) on 2UE. Citing an editorial in the British Medical Journal which confirmed there was now ‘clear evidence’ that the now discredited research linking autism with the MMR vaccine, undertaken by Andrew Wakefield, was conducted unethically and based on falsified data, Spicer asked Dorey to concede the AVN's "scare campaign" was based on "fraudulent and misleading information". When Dorey tried to direct listeners to her AVN website, Spicer ended the interview prematurely by terminating the call.. And in December 2011, in an article for the Daily Telegraph, Spicer became a public advocate for childhood vaccination when she wrote of her frustration with the growing anti-vaccination lobby.

In a 2010 Daily Telegraph article, Spicer urged politicians to approve the use of "medical marijuana".

In June 2014, Spicer delivered a TEDx talk for Southbank Women in Brisbane, Queensland. In 2015, Spicer featured in a short documentary, Let’s Talk About Breasts.

In 2015, she became an ambassador for KidsMatter, an Australian mental health and wellbeing initiative focused on primary schools and early childhood. Spicer hosted KidsMatters's Starting School videos. In the same year, she was appointed as ambassador for Autism Spectrum Australia.

In May 2017, Spicer addressed the Sydney Institute on the topic “Ways Forward for Women in the Workplace”. In her speech, Spicer argued quotas and targets are insufficient to address gender inequity in the workplace. Spicer was the MC for the 2017 International Women's Day Events in Brisbane.

In October 2017 after the Harvey Weinstein sexual abuse allegations made news, Spicer announced that she was investigating powerful Australian men in the media.. She became a vocal #MeToo campaigner on Twitter and encouraged people involved in the Australian entertainment industry to share their stories of sexual harassment in the workplace.

The ABC's investigative unit joined Spicer and she created a co-production with Fairfax Media. "These organisations have the most robust resources to uncover the structures protecting the guilty and punishing the innocent."  Spicer, Kate McClymont, Lorna Knowles and Alison Branley, won the 2018 Walkley Awards in the print/text journalism and Television/Video Current Affairs Short (less than 20 minutes) categories, for their investigation into Don Burke, who was the first to be exposed by the company.

On Australia Day in 2018 she was appointed as a Member of the Order of Australia "for significant service to the broadcast media as a journalist and television presenter, and as an ambassador for social welfare and charitable groups".  Spicer reflected, "While conditions have improved in the TV business since I initiated legal action against Network Ten, more subtle forms of pregnancy discrimination permeate many workplaces. So, while we have policies and procedures in place, there remains a rump of cultural resistance to the idea of "working mothers".

Together with Melinda Schneider, Spicer launched NOW Australia on 25 March 2018.  NOW Australia was "a service to help those who've been sexually harassed, assaulted or intimidated at work".  A month-long crowdfunding campaign was launched on the same day.  NOW Australia enlisted thirty Australian celebrities including Tina Arena, Deborah Mailman, Abby Earl and Missy Higgins to act as ambassadors. Spicer left NOW Australia in 2018 or 2019, stating that she had done so due to vicarious trauma. NOW Australia closed in June 2020. It was criticised for not meeting its goals.

Controversy

In 2019, she was accused of breaching the privacy of #MeToo victims by failing to redact the names and identities of victims who had come forward during the filming of her #MeToo TV series Silent No More. The controversy further intensified when Spicer's lawyer sent defamation warning letters to those who spoke out online about these privacy breach concerns.

Writing

On 1 May 2017, Spicer released her autobiography,The Good Girl Stripped Bare, published by ABC Books and Harper Collins, described as ‘part memoir and part manifesto’.

In 2016 Spicer contributed to the report, “Mates over Merit”, a study of gender differences in the Australian media.  Spicer’s contribution to the design, analysis and promotion of the WiM survey were recognised by the Walkley Foundation as one of three achievements supporting her nomination for the Walkley’s Women’s Leadership in Media award.

Spicer has contributed stories to the books Unbreakable by Jane Caro and Father Figures by Paul Connolly.

Tracey Spicer appeared in 3 events at the 2017 Brisbane Writers Festival in Brisbane, Queensland, Australia.

Awards
Spicer sits on the judging panel of the Caroline Jones Women in Media Young Journalists Award.

She has won or been nominated for the following awards:

2016: Named 2016 QUT Alumni Service Award Winner, in recognition of her advocacy for the QUT Learning Potential Fund, which provides scholarships to students whose financial circumstances might prevent them from pursuing higher education 

26 January 2018: Member of the Order of Australia , "For significant service to the broadcast media as a journalist and television presenter, and as an ambassador for social welfare and charitable groups"

October 2018: Winner in the social enterprise and not-for-profit category of the Australian Financial Review 100 Women of Influence awards

2018: Nomination, along with Lorna Knowles, Kate McClymont, Alison Branley and Joanne Puccini, Mid-Year Walkley Award in the Women’s Leadership in Media division for their joint investigation of Don Burke

22 November 2018: Winner, Walkley Awards in the print/text journalism and television/video current affairs short (less than 20 minutes) categories, with Kate McClymont, Lorna Knowles and Alison Branley for their investigation into Don Burke

2019: New South Wales Woman of the Year in recognition of her "contribution across NSW to industry, communities and society"

2019: Sydney Peace Prize awarded to the #MeToo movement, accepted by Spicer and Tarana Burke on 14 November 2019

Personal life
Spicer contracted COVID-19 in January 2022, and developed Long COVID. She was still sick in late June 2022, and described the disabling effect of the disease in a radio interview.

References

External links
 traceyspicer.com.au

 

1967 births
10 News First presenters
Living people
Australian freelance journalists
Australian television journalists
Walkley Award winners
People from Brisbane
Queensland University of Technology alumni
Sky News Australia reporters and presenters
Members of the Order of Australia